Joseph C. Krejci (December 19, 1910 – August 23, 1991) was a chemical engineering associate and manager of the Pyrolysis section at the Phillips Carbon Black Research facility in Borger, Texas. He is known for his work in developing the oil furnace production process for carbon black.

Personal 

Krejci was born on 19 December 1910 in Galveston, Texas, the 2nd of 9 children.  He married Fay Deen Yarbro Jan. 29, 1938 in Mineral Wells.  He died on 23 August 1991 in Borger, Texas.

Education 

Dr. Krejci obtained his bachelor of science, master's of science and Ph.D. degrees in chemical engineering from the University of Texas.

Career 

He was a chemical engineering associate and manager of pyrolysis at the Phillips Carbon Black Research facility in Borger.  He retired in 1971 following 34 years of service.

Krejci was the inventor of 31 patents in the carbon black field, many of these were also patented outside the United States. He revolutionized the manufacture of carbon black.

Awards and recognitions

 1974 - Charles Goodyear Medal from the ACS Rubber Division

References 

Polymer scientists and engineers
1910 births
1991 deaths